Odilon is a given name of French origin. The name refers to:
Odilo of Cluny, sometimes referred to as St. Odilon
Odilon Barrot (1791–1873), French politician
Odilon Lannelongue (1840–1911), French physician and surgeon
Odilon Polleunis (b. 1943), Belgian football player, winner of the Belgian Golden Shoe
Odilon Redon (1840–1916), French painter and printmaker

French masculine given names